In Carnatic music, Maddala Keli or Maddalapattu is a musical genre featuring a set of maddalam drums as the main instrument – not chenda drums – with support from a row of ilathalam. A Maddala Keli work with five maddalam players is called Panchamaddalakeli; with ten players,  Dashamaddalakeli. It sticks mainly to an eight-beat rhythmic cycle called Chembada or adi talam. It also has a segment called Kooru, where rhythmic cycles can be the six-beat panchari (pancharikkooru), the 14-beat adantha (adantha-kkooru) and the ten-beat chamba (chambakkooru). Scholars say the ensemble of thayambaka was developed from maddala keli.

See also
 Pandi Melam
 Panchari melam
 Panchavadyam
 Kathakali

Drums
Kathakali
Asian percussion instruments
Indian musical instruments
Indian styles of music